James Hinchey is an Australian former professional rugby league footballer who played in the 1990s. He played for South Sydney and Parramatta in the NSWRL competition.

Playing career
Hinchey made his first grade debut for South Sydney in round 11 of the 1992 NSWRL season against Cronulla at Caltex Field. Hinchey would play seven games for the South Sydney club throughout the year. In 1994, Hinchey signed for Parramatta and played two games for the club, in round 11 against Cronulla and in round 12 against Manly.

References

South Sydney Rabbitohs players
Parramatta Eels players
Australian rugby league players
Rugby league locks
Rugby league second-rows
1970 births
Living people